Roquetes is a Barcelona Metro station, named after the nearby Roquetes neighbourhood, in the Nou Barris district of the city of Barcelona. The station is served by line L3.

The station can be accessed from Carrer Jaume Pinent, Carrer de les Torres and Parc de Roquetes, near Carrer Vidal i Guasch. It's a mixture of a ground-level station with the current deepest sub-surface platform in the system. The single island platform is flanked by two tracks.

The station was opened on 4 October 2008, when the section of line L3 from Canyelles station to Trinitat Nova station was inaugurated.

The current Roquetes station should not be confused with Via Júlia station, on L4, which was known as Roquetes before 1999.

See also
List of Barcelona Metro stations

References

External links

Barcelona Metro line 3 stations
Railway stations in Spain opened in 2008
Transport in Nou Barris